The English expedition to Portugal also known as the British Brigade in Portugal was a brigade raised during the reign of King Charles II for service in Portugal during the ongoing Portuguese Restoration War against Spain in August 1662. The brigade, many of which were veterans of the English Civil Wars and the Dutch Revolt, then fought in all the major battles and skirmishes under the command of Frederick Schomberg, 1st Duke of Schomberg and remained in Portugal until the end of the war being subsequently disbanded by mid 1668. The brigade under Schomberg's leadership, proved a decisive factor in winning back Portugal's independence.

Background

The war between Portugal and Spain had begun with the Portuguese revolution of 1640 and had resulted in the break up of the Iberian Union. After the peace of the Pyrenees in 1659, the independence of Portugal was threatened by a resurgent Spain, and thus Portugal asked for outside support. They turned to their old ally England but the Restoration of Charles II as monarch of England proved a concern. He had previously been allied to Spain through the Treaty of Brussels after Oliver Cromwell's Republic had been at war with Spain. Charles however immediately annulled the treaty, citing King Philip IV of Spain's failure to aid in his restoration and instead answered Portugal's call for help. His marriage with Catherine of Braganza, renewed the alliance between England and Portugal despite the protestations of Spain. As part of the treaty a brigade was raised for service in Portugal in 1662 to help win her independence. The decision to send troops to Portugal came from the need to find employment for Cromwellian and Royalist veterans of the English Civil War, and the Portuguese military needed experienced veterans to help fight the Spanish.

The infantry were raised from three New Model Army regiments in Scotland that were still not disbanded. The cavalry were raised from volunteers, the majority from the Dunkirk garrison having fought the Spanish there in 1658. English parliament was to raise, pay and equip the brigade, and then once in Portugal they would be paid by the Portuguese crown. Most of the soldiers were parliamentarians but also included many Catholic Royalist Irish and Scottish soldiers. They were formed, trained and commanded by Thomas Morgan, a Welsh veteran soldier from the Dutch Revolt and the Civil War. Once formed the brigade consisted of two infantry regiments, each of 1,000 men, and a cavalry regiment, just under 1,000 men totalling for the brigade around 3,000 men.

Portugal and Spain
Once in Portugal the British regiments at once were put into action but in the first few months of deployment, difficulties arose from the opposition of many Portuguese officers. To add to this, the Portuguese treated the British with contempt, not the least because of their protestant religion. Despite this the Portuguese soon recognised that the British were the more reliable component in the army and made a more serious impression on the Spanish than other troops in the Portuguese Army. The brigade, however, suffered with sickness, which accounted for many losses, and battle casualties were rarely ever replaced from home.

The British army uniform had red jackets (doublets) as a colour having been established during the Elizabethan times. By the 1660s red had become the predominant colour in British uniforms since the creation of the New Model Army in 1645. The regiment of infantry or horse was usually just designated as a regiment number, and not by the name of the colonel as was custom at the time. The first colonel was Murrough O'Brien, 1st Earl of Inchiquin, who also commanded the British Brigade in the early stages. In 1662 he was succeeded, by the Frederick Schomberg, 1st Duke of Schomberg in 1663 who was sent as military adviser to Lisbon with the secret approval of Charles II. Louis XIV of France, in order not to infringe the treaty just made with Spain, deprived Schomberg of his French officers. In the field, however, the regiment was commanded by Michael Dongan, later by Lawrence Dempsey and finally by Frederick's son Meinhardt Schomberg. The first infantry regiment was commanded by Henry Pearson while the second infantry regiment was commanded by James Apsley as colonel, and also Francis Moore as acting colonel. In 1665 the 2nd regiment was commanded by William Sheldon.

In the spring of 1663, a Spanish army under the command of Don Juan de Austria, son of Philip IV of Spain, had overrun the greater part of south Portugal with the important city of Évora taken on 22 May. This opened up for potential march on Lisbon,  to the west. The British brigade moved with the Portuguese army under Sancho Manoel de Vilhena. The first battle took place near Degebe in June where a Spanish attempt to cross the river was defeated. Following this the army met up with the Spanish army outside Évora. At the Battle of Ameixial fought nearby, the Anglo-Portuguese swiftly defeated the Spanish - Juan of Austria's standard was captured when his squadron was almost wiped out. The standard was later presented to King Afonso VI of Portugal himself. The Spanish casualties were very high, all of their artillery and baggage was captured, and the army was forced to retreat to Badajoz in Extremadura. The Spanish garrison of Évora nearly 3,700 men was then besieged but they being abandoned, capitulated on 24 June without a single casualty being inflicted on the British brigade.

After more quarrels with the Portuguese high command to get supplies to his men, Schomberg and the British brigade pressed ahead in the next campaign. On 10 June 1664 the siege of Valencia de Alcántara took place and a fortnight later after a breach had been in the defences - the English who bore the brunt leading the main assault suffered heavy casualties but forced the surrender of the Spanish garrison. The Portuguese soon realised their mistake in the mistrust and sent heaps of praise upon Schomberg and the English. The Count of Castelo Melhor made a comment soon after the surrender of Valencia de Alcantara.

On 17 June 1665 at the Battle of Montes Claros the brigade was crucial in the outcome. The Portuguese under commander António Luís de Meneses, 1st Marquis of Marialva positioned his heaviest infantry, composing the British brigade under Schomberg once more, in two lines in the most vulnerable area and ordered his artillery to support them. As the battle raged Schomberg had his horse shot from under him, and was nearly captured, but the veteran brigade were able break the defences to bring about a decisive victory over the Spaniards under Luis de Benavides Carrillo, Marquis of Caracena.

After Montes Claros the Spaniards failed to gain any compensating advantage but the war continued and Portugal was safe from further attack. Over the next two years Schomberg and the depleted English brigade helped to lead a series of raids across the border. In November they captured the fortress of A Guarda, plundered Alburquerque and stormed Tui. Over the course of the next year little fighting took place as France signed a treaty in March 1667. This never took effect as France never declared war on Spain.

A ceasefire in September 1667 was declared after a palace coup within the Portuguese court forced King Afonso VI of Portugal into exile. Castelo Melhor was dismissed and went into exile in England, where he became an adviser to King Charles II.

Aftermath
A treaty had been signed by England and Spain at Madrid in 1667; in that treaty England agreed to mediate a treaty between Portugal and Spain or at least a thirty-year truce.

In 1668, desperate to reduce its military commitments, at almost any price, Spain accepted the loss of the Crown of Portugal and formally recognized the sovereignty of the House of Braganza by signing the Treaty of Lisbon with the promised English mediation.

At the conclusion of peace and with the war over, the brigade was then broken up with 1,000 men remaining in total out of the 3,500 men who made up the force. The remainder returned to seek service in England or abroad - but places and positions were hard to find.

About half of the men were incorporated in the Tangier garrison, and the remainder were shipped back to England. Some remained in Portugal having found wives or sought to join various trades.

Notes

References 
 
 
 
 
 
 
 
Attribution:
 

Conflicts in 1662
1660s in England
1660s in Portugal
1660s in Spain
Wars involving Portugal
Wars involving Spain
Wars involving England
17th-century military history of the Kingdom of England
Portuguese Restoration War
English Army
Portugal–United Kingdom military relations
England–Portugal relations
Charles II of England
Catherine of Braganza